Matti Patteri (born 5 November 1941) is a Finnish former sports shooter. He competed in the 50 metre pistol event at the 1968 Summer Olympics.

References

External links
 

1941 births
Living people
Finnish male sport shooters
Olympic shooters of Finland
Shooters at the 1968 Summer Olympics
People from Lapua
Sportspeople from South Ostrobothnia